Bird conservation is a field in the science of conservation biology related to threatened birds. Humans have had a profound effect on many bird species.  Over one hundred species have gone extinct in historical times, although the most dramatic human-caused extinctions occurred in the Pacific Ocean as humans colonised the islands of Melanesia, Polynesia and Micronesia, during which an estimated 750–1,800 species of birds became extinct. According to Worldwatch Institute, many bird populations are currently declining worldwide, with 1,200 species facing extinction in the next century. The biggest cited reason surrounds habitat loss. Other threats include overhunting, accidental mortality due to structural collisions, long-line fishing bycatch, pollution, competition and predation by pet cats, oil spills and pesticide use and climate change. Governments, along with numerous conservation charities, work to protect birds in various ways, including legislation, preserving and restoring bird habitat, and establishing captive populations for reintroductions.

See Late Quaternary prehistoric birds for birds which disappeared in prehistoric and early historic times, usually due to human activity (i.e., starting with the Upper Paleolithic Revolution). For birds having gone extinct in modern times (since 1500), see List of extinct birds.

Threats to birds

Habitat loss
The most critical threat facing threatened birds is the destruction and fragmentation of habitat. The loss of forests, plains and other natural systems into agriculture, mines, and urban developments, the draining of swamps and other wetlands, and logging reduce potential habitat for many species. In addition the remaining patches of habitat are often too small or fragmented by the construction of roads or other such barriers that cause populations in these fragmented islands to become vulnerable to localised extinction. In addition many forest species show limited abilities to disperse and occupy new forest fragments (see Island biogeography). The loss of tropical rainforest is the most pressing problem, as these forests hold the highest number of species yet are being destroyed quickly. Habitat loss has been implicated in a number of extinctions, including the ivory-billed woodpecker (disputed because of "rediscovery"), Bachman's warbler and the dusky seaside sparrow.

Introduced species

Historically the threat posed by introduced species has probably caused the most extinctions of birds, particularly on islands. most prehistoric human caused extinctions were insular as well. Many island species evolved in the absence of predators and consequently lost many anti-predator behaviours. As humans traveled around the world they brought with them many foreign animals which disturbed these island species. Some of these were unfamiliar predators, like rats, feral cats, and pigs; others were competitors, such as other bird species, or herbivores that degraded breeding habitat. Disease can also play a role; introduced avian malaria is thought to be a primary cause of many extinctions in Hawaii. The dodo is the most famous example of a species that was probably driven to extinction by introduced species (although human hunting also played a role), other species that were victims of introduced species were the Lyall's wren, poʻo-uli and the Laysan millerbird. Many species currently threatened with extinction are vulnerable to introduced species, such as the kokako, black robin, Mariana crow, and the Hawaiian duck.

Hunting and exploitation
Humans have exploited birds for a very long time, and sometimes this exploitation has resulted in extinction. Overhunting occurred in some instances with a naive species unfamiliar with humans, such as the moa of New Zealand, in other cases it was an industrial level of hunting that led to extinction. The passenger pigeon was once the most numerous species of bird alive (possibly ever), overhunting reduced a species that once numbered in the billions to extinction. Hunting pressure can be for food, sport, feathers, or even come from scientists collecting museum specimens. Collection of great auks for museums pushed the already rare species to extinction.

The harvesting of parrots for the pet trade has led to many species becoming endangered. Between 1986 and 1988 two million parrots were legally imported into the US alone. Parrots are also illegally smuggled between countries, and rarer species can command high prices.

Hybridisation
Hybridisation may also endanger birds, damaging the gene stock. For example, the American black duck has been often reported hybridising with the mallard, starting a slow decline.

Gamebird hybrids are particularly common and many breeders produce hybrids that may be accidentally or intentionally introduced into the wild.

Other threats

Birds face a number of other threats. Pollution has led to serious declines in some species. Increasingly large volumes of plastic waste are being transported by wind and ocean currents throughout the planet, and mistaken ingestion by many species is eventually fatal.  Seabirds are also vulnerable to oil spills, which destroy the plumage's waterproofing, causing the birds to drown or die of hypothermia. Light pollution can also have a damaging effect on some species, particularly nocturnal seabirds such as petrels.  The pesticide DDT was responsible for thinning egg shells in nesting birds, particularly seabirds and birds of prey that are high on the food chain. The use of pesticides continues to harm birds, especially insectivores like swallows that have lost a food source from the use of insecticides in agriculture. A particularly dangerous class of pesticides is the seed-coating neonicotinoids. Neonicotinoids include a neurotoxin that bioaccumulates in the tissue of birds and is associated with impairment of reproduction.

Seabirds face another threat in the form of bycatch, where birds in the water become tangled in fishing nets or hooked on lines set out by long-line fisheries. As many as 100,000 albatrosses are hooked and drown each year on tuna lines set out by long-line fisheries.

Birds are also threatened by high rise buildings, communications towers, and other human-related activities and structures; estimates vary from about 3.5 to 975 million birds a year in the North America alone. The largest source of human-related bird death is due to glass windows, which kill 100–900 million birds a year. The next largest sources of human-caused death are hunting (100+ million), house cats (100 million), cars and trucks (50 to 100 million), electric power lines (174 million), and pesticides (67 million).  Birds are also killed in large quantities by flying into communication tower guidelines, usually after being attracted by tower lights. This phenomenon is called towerkill and is responsible for 5–50 million birds deaths a year.  Similarly, natural gas flaring can attract and kill large numbers of birds.   Approximately 7,500 migrating songbirds were attracted to and killed by the flare at the liquefied natural gas terminal in Saint John, New Brunswick, Canada on September 13, 2013. Similar incidents have occurred at flares on offshore oil and gas installations.

The recent growth in the renewable energy industry is also increasing the threat to birds farther away from dense human population centers.   As of late 2019,  the capacity of wind power in the U.S. reached 100 GW (gigawatt).  Studies conducted at a variety of farms found fewer than 14, and typically fewer than 4, direct bird deaths per year per installed megawatt; suggesting cumulative mortality is approaching the order of a million individuals annually.   Migrating songbirds appeared to be the most strongly impacted in some studies.   The primary impact of commercial solar farms – the majority utilizing photovoltaic collectors which are mounted near the ground – is from extensive land clearing and increases in long-distance power transmission infrastructure.   In 2015, biologists working for the state of California estimated that 3,500 birds died at the Ivanpah concentrated solar power demonstration plant in the span of a year; "many of them burned alive while flying near the tower collector where air temperatures reached up to 1,000 degrees Fahrenheit."

Conservation techniques
Scientists and conservation professionals have developed a number of techniques to protect bird species. These techniques have had varying levels of success.

Captive breeding
Captive breeding, or ex-situ conservation, has been used in a number of instances to save species from extinction. The principle is to create a viable population of a species in either zoos or breeding facilities, for later reintroduction back into the wild. As such a captive population can either serve as an insurance against the species going extinct in the wild or as a last-ditch effort in situations where conservation in the wild is impossible. Captive breeding has been used to save several species from extinction, the most famous example being the California condor, a species that declined to less than thirty birds. In order to save the California condor the decision was made to take every individual left in the wild into captivity. From these 22 individuals a breeding programme began that brought the numbers up to 273 by 2005. An even more impressive recovery was that of the Mauritius kestrel, which by 1974 had dropped to only four individuals, yet by 2006 the population was 800.

Reintroduction and translocations
Reintroductions of captive bred populations can occur to replenish wild populations of an endangered species, to create new populations  or to restore a species after it has become extinct in the wild. Reintroductions helped bring the wild populations of Hawaiian geese (nene) from 30 birds to over 500. The Mauritius kestrel was successfully reintroduced into the wild after its captive breeding programme. Reintroductions can be very difficult and often fail if insufficient preparations are made, as species born in captivity may lack the skills and knowledge needed for life in the wild after living in captivity. Reintroductions can also fail if the causes of a birds decline have not been adequately addressed. Attempts to reintroduce the Bali starling into the wild failed due to continued poaching of reintroduced birds.

The introduction of captives of unknown pedigree can pose a threat to native populations. Domestic fowl have threatened endemic species such as Gallus g. bankiva while pheasants such as the ring-necked pheasant and captive cheer pheasants of uncertain origin have escaped into the wild or have been intentionally introduced. Green peafowl of similar mixed origins confiscated from local bird dealers have been released into areas with native wild birds.

Translocations involve moving populations of threatened species into areas of suitable habitat currently unused by the species. There are several reasons for doing this; the creation of secondary populations that act as an insurance against disaster, or in many cases threats faced by the original population in its current location. One famous translocation was of the kakapo of New Zealand. These large flightless parrots were unable to cope with introduced predators in their remaining habitat on Stewart Island, so were moved to smaller offshore islands that had been cleared of predators. From there a recovery programme has managed to maintain and eventually increase their numbers.

Habitat protection
As the loss and destruction of habitat is the most serious threat facing many bird species, conservation organisations and government agencies tasked with protecting birds work to protect areas of natural habitat. This can be achieved through purchasing land of conservation importance, setting aside land or gazetting it as a national park or other protected area, and passing legislation preventing landowners from undertaking damaging land use practices, or paying them not to undertake those activities. The goals of habitat protection for birds and other threatened animals and plants often conflicts with other stakeholders, such as landowners and businesses, who can face economically damaging restrictions on their activities. Plans to protect crucial habitat for the spotted owl of North America required the protection of large areas of old growth forest in the western United States; this was opposed by logging companies who claimed it would cause job losses and reduced profits.

See also

Avicide
Berne Convention on the Conservation of European Wildlife and Natural Habitats
Bird Protection Quebec
BirdLife International
Bird-skyscraper collisions
Climate change and birds
Fundación ProAves
Hawaiian honeycreeper conservation
International Convention on the Protection of Birds
Migratory Bird Treaty
The Institute for Bird Populations
Raptor conservation
Royal Australasian Ornithologists Union
SOS/BirdLife Slovakia

References

External links
The Worlds Rarest Birds
Birding Weekends – a Kruger National Park (KNP) Birding Conservation Project
Maharashtra Pakshimitra
Pakistan Avicultural Foundation